Trimithi is a small village in Cyprus, located 6 km west of Kyrenia. De facto, it is under the control of Northern Cyprus. Its population in 2011 was 1,268.

References

Communities in Kyrenia District
Populated places in Girne District